The 1991 U.S. Women's Open was the 46th edition of the U.S. Women's Open, held July 11–14 at Colonial Country Club in Fort Worth, Texas. Meg Mallon shot a final round 67 (−4) to finish at 283 (−1), two strokes ahead of runner-up Pat Bradley. Mallon trailed Bradley by three strokes with ten holes to play. It was the second of Mallon's four major titles; she won the LPGA Championship two weeks earlier. Mallon won her second U.S. Women's Open and final major thirteen years later in 2004.

Play was so painstakingly slow during the first round that Lori Garbacz decided to protest. While playing the 14th hole, Garbacz had her caddie go to a nearby pay phone and order a pizza that she wanted delivered to the 17th tee. The pizza was waiting for Garbacz and she had plenty of time to eat it, as there were two groups ahead of her waiting to tee off.

Mallon won $110,000, the championship's first six-figure winner's share. It was an increase of nearly 30% over the previous year and double that of just four years earlier.  Mallon's name was also engraved into the course's Wall of Champions.

Through 2019, this is the only time the championship has been played in the state of Texas. Colonial has been an annual stop on the PGA Tour since 1946; now known as the Charles Schwab Challenge, it is usually played in May. It also hosted the U.S. Open in 1941, the last before World War II. It was the last time a U. S. Women's Open was conducted on a golf course that hosts a men's PGA Tour annual event until 2023, when the tournament is scheduled to be conducted at the Pebble Beach Golf Links, one of the courses of the AT&T Pebble Beach Pro-Am and the PURE Insurance Championship for the PGA Tour Champions (over-50).

Past champions in the field

Made the cut

Source:

Missed the cut

Source:

Round summaries

First round
Thursday, July 11, 1991

Source:

Second round
Friday, July 12, 1991

Source:

Third round
Saturday, July 13, 1991

Source:

Final round
Sunday, July 14, 1991

Source:

References

External links
U.S. Women's Open - past champions - 1991

U.S. Women's Open
Golf in Texas
Sports competitions in Texas
Sports in Fort Worth, Texas
Women's sports in Texas
U.S. Women's Open
U.S. Women's Open
U.S. Women's Open
U.S. Women's Open